The 'Doctors' Support Network' (DSN) is a confidential self-help group for physicians in the United Kingdom with mental health concerns. It was founded by Dr Soames Michelson and Dr Liz Miller in 1996. Registered Charity Number (England & Wales):  1103741

The DSN has approximately 500 members and has successfully campaigned for better treatment of doctors with mental health issues by the General Medical Council.

External links
 http://www.dsn.org.uk/

References

Health charities in the United Kingdom
Mental health organisations in the United Kingdom